Akao is a Japanese surname. Notable people with the surname include:

, Japanese footballer
, Japanese ultra-rightist
, Japanese voice actress
, Japanese samurai
, Japanese diplomat
, Japanese business theorist
, Japanese footballer
 

Japanese-language surnames